This is a list of notable people from Ghent, who were either born in Ghent, or spent part of their life there.

People born in Ghent

Before the 19th century

Henry of Ghent, scholastic philosopher (c. 1217 – 1293)
Jacob van Artevelde, statesman and political leader (c. 1290 – 1345)
Franz Ackerman, statesman (c. 1330 – 1387)
Philip van Artevelde, Flemish patriot (c. 1340 – 1382)
John of Gaunt, 1st Duke of Lancaster (1340–1399)
Hugo van der Goes, painter (c. 1440 – 1482)
Alexander Agricola, composer of the Renaissance (1445/6 - 1506)
Jacob Obrecht, composer of the Renaissance (c. 1457 – 1505)
Adrianus Todeschinus, captain of the papal guard (1471–1546)
Jacques Buus, Franco-Flemish composer and organist of the Renaissance (c. 1500 – 1565)
Charles V, Holy Roman Emperor (‘’Charles Quint’’, 1500–1558)
Cornelius Canis, Franco-Flemish composer of the Renaissance, music director for Charles V in the 1540–1550s
Jan Utenhove, writer (c. 1520 – 1566)
Lieven de Key, architect (1560–1627)
Philippe van Lansberg, astronomer (1561–1632)
Daniel Heinsius, scholar of the Dutch Renaissance (1580–1655)
Jean-Baptiste Loeillet (of London), flutist, oboist, and harpsichordist (1680–1730)
Jean-Baptiste Loeillet (of Ghent), composer (1688 – c. 1720)
Josse Boutmy, organist and harpsichordist (1697–1779)
Peter Anton von Verschaffelt, sculptor and architect (1710–1793)
Lieven Bauwens, industrialist (1769–1822)

19th century
Josse Joseph de Lehaye, politician, (1800–1888) 
Henri Colson, burgomaster of Ghent (1819-1900)
Eugène Van Bemmel, author and educator (1824–1880)
Frans de Potter, writer, (1834–1904) 
Charles John Seghers, Jesuit clergyman and missionary (1839–1886)
Paul de Vigne, sculptor (1843–1901)
De Vriendt brothers, painters (second half of 19th century)
Pierre De Geyter, socialist, composer, and wood carver (1848–1932)
Victor Horta, Art Nouveau architect (1861–1947)
Henri Lammens, Jesuit and orientalist (1862–1937)
Maurice Maeterlinck, poet, playwright, essayist, recipient of the Nobel Prize in Literature (1862–1949)
Théo van Rysselberghe, neo-impressionist painter 1862–1926)
Constant Montald, monumental and symbolic painter 1862-1944
Brice Meuleman, Jesuit, 2nd Archbishop of Calcutta (now Kolkata) (1862–1924)
Leo Baekeland, chemist and inventor of Bakelite (1863–1944)
Pierre Louÿs, poet and romantic writer (1870–1925)
Karel van de Woestijne, writer (1878–1929)
George Van Biesbroeck, astronomer (1880–1974)
Gustave Van de Woestijne, painter (1881–1947)
Geo Verbanck, sculptor (1881–1961)
Frits Van den Berghe, expressionist painter (1883–1939)
Valerius Geerebaert, Redemptorist (1884–1957)
Maurice Langaskens, painter (1884—1946)
George Sarton, historian of science (1884–1956)
Désiré Defauw, conductor and violinist (1885–1960)
Jean Ray, writer  (1887–1964)
Richard Minne, writer and poet (1891–1965)
Corneille Jean François Heymans, physiologist and recipient of the Nobel Prize in Physiology or Medicine (1892–1968)
Edgard Colle, chess master (1897–1932)
Henri Story, politician (1897–1944)
Emma De Vigne, painter (1850-98)

20th century
Suzanne Lilar, playwright, essayist and novelist (1901–1992)
Jozef Vergote, Egyptologist and coptologist (1910–1992)
Johan Daisne, author, poet, and librarian (1912–1978)
Théo Lefèvre, lawyer and prime minister of Belgium (1914–1973)
Armand Pien, weatherman (1920–2003)
Marc Sleen, comics artist and cartoonist (born 1922)
Willy De Clercq, politician (born 1927)
Marcel Storme, lawyer and professor at the Ghent University (born 1930)
Jean-Marie Albert Bottequin, photographer and journalist (born 1941)
Graba'  (Ignace De Graeve), designer and artist (1940-2016)
Jacques Rogge, former president of the IOC (born 1942)
Gérard Mortier, musical artistic director (born 1943)
René Jacobs, counter-tenor and conductor (born 1946)
Philippe Herreweghe, conductor (born 1947)
Marc Mortier, first CEO of Flanders Expo (1948–2004)
Godfried-Willem Raes, composer, performer, and instrument maker (born 1952)
Matthias Storme, lawyer, academic, thinker, and politician (born 1959)
Dirk Brossé, composer, conductor
Frank De Winne, cosmonaut (born 1961)
Saul Akkemay (Panbello), freelance publicist and columnist (born 1964)
Nic Balthazar, movie critic and film director (born 1964)
Michel de Kemmeter, entrepreneur and author in the fields of Personal development and Intangible assets and Human Sustainable Development (born 1964)
Peter Goes, children's author and illustrator
Helmut Lotti, musician (born 1969)
Filip Meirhaeghe, cyclist (born 1971)
Matthew Gilmore, cyclist (born 1972)
Freya Van den Bossche, socialist politician (born 1975)
Cédric Van Branteghem, athlete (born 1979)
Bradley Wiggins, British cyclist (born 1980)
Jonas Geirnaert, creator of animation shorts (born 1982)
Iljo Keisse, cyclist (born 1982)
Eline Berings, athlete (born 1986)
Vadis Odjidja-Ofoe, football player (born 1989)
Kevin De Bruyne, professional footballer (born 1991)
Gijs van Hoecke, cyclist (born 1991)
Gaelle Mys, Olympic gymnast (born 1991)
Xavier Henry, shooting guard/small forward for the NBA's Los Angeles Lakers (born 1995)

Lived in Ghent

Before the 19th century

Saint Amand, Roman Catholic saint (584–675)
Saint Bavo, patron saint of Ghent (589–654)
Jan Boeksent, Franciscan Sculptor.
Hubert van Eyck, painter (c. 1366 – 1426)
Jan van Eyck, painter (c. 1385 – 1441)
Joos van Wassenhove, painter (c. 1410 – c. 1480)
Maximilian I and Mary of Burgundy married in Ghent in 1477
William Damasus Lindanus, Bishop of Ghent (1525–1588)
Jodocus Hondius, artist, engraver, and cartographer (1563–1612)
Tobie Matthew, English Catholic priest (1577–1655)
Caspar de Crayer, painter (1582–1669)
David t'Kindt, architect (1699-1770)
Jan Frans Willems, writer (1793–1846)
Jacques-Joseph Haus, criminal law and natural rights professor at Ghent University (1796–1881)

19th century
Joseph Plateau, physicist, taught at the Ghent University (1801–1883)
Louis XVIII of France was exiled in Ghent during the Hundred Days in 1815
François-Auguste Gevaert, composer (1828–1908)
Rosalie Loveling, poet, novelist, and essayist (1834–1875)
Virginie Loveling, poet, novelist, and essayist (1836–1923)
Frans Rens, writer, (1805–1874)

20th century
Erwin Schrödinger, physicist (1877-1961)
Paul van Imschoot, Roman Catholic biblical theologian (1889-1968)
Arend Joan Rutgers, physical chemist and professors at the Ghent University (1903–1998)
Jean Daskalidès, gynecologist and director of Leonidas chocolates (1922–1992)
Hugo Claus, author, poet, dramatist, film and stage director (1929–2008)
Jan Hoet, founder of SMAK (‘’Stedelijk Museum voor Actuele Kunst’’) (born 1936)
Wilfried Martens, Christian Democratic politician and prime minister (born 1936)
Royden Rabinowitch, Canadian sculptor (born 1943)
Patrick Sercu, Belgian track cyclist (born 1944)
Guy Verhofstadt, liberal politician and prime minister (born 1953)
Johan Vande Lanotte, lawyer and politician (born 1955)
Herman Brusselmans, novelist and poet (born 1957)
Leen Ryckaert, psychologist (born 1957)
Dirk Braeckman, photographer (born 1958)
Tom Lanoye, novelist and poet (born 1958)
Peter Vermeersch, composer, clarinet player, and producer (born 1959)
Michaël Borremans, painter (born 1963)
Lucas de Lil, composer and conductor (born 1963)
Erwin Mortier, author and poet (born 1965)
Bianka Panova, rhythmic gymnast (born 1970)
Lorenz Bogaert, entrepreneur (born 1976)
Gabriel Ríos, Puerto Rican musician (born 1978)
Tyler Farrar, American cyclist (born 1984)

Ghent

Ghent
Ghent